Mourant is an offshore law firm headquartered in Saint-Helier, Jersey. Mourant is one of the largest offshore law firms, with just under 60 partners and 500+ staff.  It is a member of the offshore magic circle.

History

Mourant is the result of successive mergers of various law firms, most recently that of Mourant du Feu & Jeune and Ozannes in 2010.
In the same year, the Mourant group sells Mourant International Finance Administration to State Street, Mourant Private Wealth to RBC and Mourant Equity Compensation Solutions to HBOS. In 2018, it changed its name from "Mourant Ozannes LP" back to "Mourant LP".

Offices

While primarily based in Jersey, Mourant has offices in other jurisdictions such as the British Virgin Islands, the Cayman Islands, Guernsey, Hong Kong and the United Kingdom. The tax avoidance campaign group ActionAid reported that more than 200 companies belonging to at least 26 multinational companies have subsidiaries incorporated in Jersey at 22 Grenville Street, Mourant's headquarters.

Awards and recognition

The firm was designated best offshore law firm in the US by Hedgeweek.com in 2013 and received an award from The Lawyer in 2011 as offshore firm of the year.

External links
Official website

References

Offshore law firms
Law firms established in 2010
2010 establishments in Jersey